Aina may refer to:

 Aina (given name)

Places
 Aina (Crete), a town of ancient Crete
 Aïna River, a river in Cameroon and Gabon
 Aina, Iran, a village in Kermanshah Province, Iran

Art and entertainment
 Aina (1977 film), a 1977 Pakistani film
 Aina (2013 film), a Pakistani romantic drama film
 Aina (band), a 2003 progressive metal supergroup, and their album, Aina, Days of Rising Doom
 Aina (book), a Nepalese book by Ramlal Joshi
 Aina Indou, a character from the .hack// franchise

Acronyms
 AINA (organization), a French non-governmental organization based in Kabul
 Arctic Institute of North America, a research institute and educational organization located in the University of Calgary
 Association of Inland Navigation Authorities, Membership organisation for navigation authorities in the UK
 Assyrian International News Agency

Other uses
 Aina the End, a Japanese singer and idol

See also
 Aaina (disambiguation)
 Ainaa (TV program)
 Ina (disambiguation)